Qassem Mohammed Bahaibah (born 1973 in Marib) is a Yemeni politician who has been served as minister of Health and Population in the cabinet of Yemen since 18 December 2020.

See also 

 Cabinet of Yemen
 Politics of Yemen

References 

Health ministers of Yemen
Living people
1973 births
21st-century Yemeni politicians
People from Marib Governorate
Second Maeen Cabinet
Sanaa University alumni